This page is a list of the 101 Grade II listed buildings in the London Borough of Bexley. There are also four Grade II-listed entries on the Register of Historic Parks and Gardens of Special Historic Interest in England.

Listed buildings

|}

Parks and gardens

|}

See also
 Grade I and II* listed buildings in the London Borough of Bexley
 Grade II listed buildings in London
 List of sites on the National Register of Historic Parks and Gardens

Notes

References

External links
 

 
Lists of Grade II listed buildings in London